Al-Arabi Badr Mokhtar (born 23 October 2001) is an Egyptian professional footballer who plays as a defensive midfielder for Tala'ea El Gaish on loan from Al Ahly.

Career statistics

Club

Notes

References

2001 births
Living people
Egyptian footballers
Egypt youth international footballers
Association football midfielders
Al Ahly SC players
Egyptian Premier League players
Future FC (Egypt) players